Asoka is a 1955 Sri Lankan romantic musical based on the Bollywood film Sheesa.

Cast
 Sumith Bibile as Sarath
 Pushpa Janet as Asoka
 Ananda Weerakoon as Harry
 Punya Heendeniya
 Eddie Yapa as Pattiya
 Benjamin Fernando as Seeya
 D. J. Samarakkody
 Sumith Dissanayake as Doctor
 Prema Kanthi
 Wimala Kumari as Sisi
 Sheela Renuka as Sarath's sister
 S. H. Jothipala as Goviya
 Oliver Silva as Thel Veda
 Dharmadasa Kulatunga as Beggar
 W. Chularatne as Donald
 Noel Perera
 Marcus Perera
 N. R. Dias
 G. S. B. Rani
 Seetha Nanayakkara
 E. Marshall Perera

Songs
The songs were recorded by the cast for the movie and by prominent playback singers for general release:

"Katharagamey" – Jikki, Dharmadasa Walpola and chorus (lyrics by Abeysekera)
"Sataneki Jivithe" – Dharmadasa Walpola (lyrics by Abeysekera)
"Thanivay Upanne" – Mohideen Baig (lyrics by Abeysekera; melody from 1954 Bollywood film Dost)
"Maruwa Maruwa" – G. S. B. Rani Perera (lyrics by Abeysekera)
"Payana Sanda Sey" – G. S. B. Rani Perera and Dharmadasa Walpola (lyrics by Piyasena Costa)
"Adare Sagarey" – G. S. B. Rani Perera
"Prem Suwandai" – Dharmadasa Walpola and Chitra Somapala (melody from the song  Äaja re Baalam""by Sandhya Mukherjee in the Hindi movie Ek Do Teen,1953.)
"Meka Thama Dewiangai" – Ananda Samarakoon, Dharmadasa Walpola and Mohideen Baig (A. J. Kareem and Haroon Lantra in movie)
"Loke Sihinayak" – Mohideen Baig and G. S. B. Rani Perera (lyrics by Abeysekera; melody from Hemant Kumar and Lata Mangeshkar's "Jaag Dard-e-Ishq Jaag" in 1953 Bollywood film Anarkali)
"Prem Pahana Niwa" – Mohideen Baig and G. S. B. Rani Perera (melody from 1953 Tamil movie Avan)
"Seeya Manamalaya" – Mohideen Baig and Dharmadasa Walpola (Eddie Yapa and A.J. Kareem in movie. Lyrics by Abeysekera)
"Prem Geethai Sangeethay" – Sathyawathi (Vindoini in movie) melody from : "Mai to chali re piya ke desh" by Geeta Dutt in the Hindi movie "Suhaag Sindoor", 1953

External links 
 - Song by Dharmadasa Walpola and Jikki

1955 films
Sri Lankan black-and-white films
Sri Lankan romance films
1950s romance films